Gyullidzha or Gyullija or Gyulyudzha may refer to:
 Sarahart, Armenia
 Spandaryan, Shirak, Armenia
 Tsaghkut, Armenia
 Vardenis, Aragatsotn, Armenia
 Güllücə, Azerbaijan
 Gyulyudzha, Iran

See also
 Güllüce (disambiguation)